Tech N9ne may refer to:
 TEC-9, a semi-automatic handgun
 Tech N9ne, an American rapper
 Todd Terry, an American DJ who sometimes performed under the handle "Tech Nine"